Fannie Porter (February 12, 1873 – c. 1940) was a well-known madam in 19th-century Texas, in the United States.  She is best known for her association with famous outlaws of the day and for her popular  San Antonio brothel.

Career as a madam
Porter was born in England and traveled to the United States around the age of one with her family. By age 15, she was working as a prostitute in San Antonio, Texas. By the age of 20, she had started her own brothel and became extremely popular for having a cordial and sincere attitude, choosing only the most attractive young women as her "girls", her requiring that her "girls" practice good hygiene, and for maintaining an immaculate personal appearance. Her brothel was located at the corner of Durango and San Saba streets, better known as the Sporting District.

By 1895, her brothel in San Antonio was one of the more popular of the Old West. It had become known as a frequent stop off for outlaws. Butch Cassidy, the Sundance Kid, Kid Curry, and other members of the Wild Bunch gang frequented her business. Della Moore, one of her "girls", became the girlfriend to Kid Curry, remaining with him until her arrest for passing money from one of his robberies (she was arrested, but acquitted, eventually returning to work for Porter once again).

Lillie Davis, another of her "girls", became involved with outlaw and Wild Bunch member Will "News" Carver. She later claimed she had married Carver in Fort Worth before his death in 1901, but there are no records to verify the alleged marriage. It is possible that the Sundance Kid and his girlfriend Etta Place, whose true identity and eventual disappearance from history has long been a mystery, first met while she worked for Porter, but this never has been confirmed. Wild Bunch gang member Laura Bullion also is believed to have at times worked for Porter between 1898 and 1901.

Porter was well respected for her discretion, always refusing to turn in a wanted outlaw to the authorities. She also was known for being extremely defensive of her "girls", insisting that any who mistreated them never return to her brothel. She generally employed anywhere from five to eight girls, all ranging in ages from 18 to 25, and all of whom lived and worked inside her brothel. Her business was popular with outlaws of the day as well as with lawmen, and she made sure that any lawmen who entered received the best treatment. William Pinkerton, of the Pinkerton National Detective Agency, once paid her a visit.

By the early 20th century, the tide had begun to turn against active, openly operating brothels. Porter had been arrested in 1888 and 1891 but it was the investigation into her affiliation with the Wild Bunch that led her to move her operations to her home in 1901. Eventually, she retired and faded from history. It is not known where she went after her retirement. Most agree that she retired semi-wealthy. Some stories indicate that she married a man of wealth, some indicate she retired into seclusion, and others indicate she returned to England. None of those are confirmed. Later rumors indicated that she lived until 1940, when she was killed in a car accident in El Paso, Texas. However, this also is not certain.

Gallery

References

External links
 
 
 

1873 births
American brothel owners and madams
American prostitutes
People of the American Old West
Year of death unknown
19th-century American businesspeople
19th-century American businesswomen
British emigrants to the United States